The Yellow Christ (in French: Le Christ jaune) is a painting executed by Paul Gauguin in 1889 in Pont-Aven. Together with The Green Christ, it is considered to be one of the key works of Symbolism in symbolic mythological paintings of the older era as represented by Symbolism  .

Gauguin first visited Pont-Aven in 1886. He returned to the village in early 1888 to stay until mid-October, when he left to join Vincent van Gogh in Arles, for little more than two months. Early in 1889, Gauguin was back to Pont-Aven to stay there until spring 1890. It was only for a short visit in summer 1889 to Paris to see the Exposition universelle and to arrange the Volpini Exhibition that Gauguin interrupted this sojourn. Soon after his return to Pont-Aven he painted The Yellow Christ.

The painting is a symbolic piece that shows the crucifixion of Jesus Christ taking place in 19th-century northern France as Breton women are gathered in prayer. Gauguin relies heavily on bold lines to define his figures and reserves shading only for the women. The autumn palette of yellow, red and green in the landscape echoes the dominant yellow in the figure of Christ. The bold outlines and flatness of the forms in this painting are typical of the cloisonnist style.

A study for The Yellow Christ in pencil is preserved in the Thyssen-Bornemisza Museum, and a version in watercolor is in the collection of the Art Institute of Chicago, gift of Elizabeth F. Chapman.

Notes

References
 Gauguin et le Christ jaune, Musée de Pont-Aven, (24 June - 2 October) 2000  

Christ, The Yellow
Paintings depicting the Crucifixion of Jesus
1889 paintings
Paintings in Buffalo, New York
Paintings in the collection of the Art Institute of Chicago
Paintings in the collection of the Albright–Knox Art Gallery